Sunny South is an unincorporated community in Wilcox County, Alabama.

Geography

References

Unincorporated communities in Alabama
Unincorporated communities in Wilcox County, Alabama